Head Not Found is a Norwegian record label, a sublabel of Voices Music & Entertainment, specializing in various heavy metal subgenres. They describe the genres as Black, Death, Doom, Thrash, Gothic, Viking Metal and Ambient. Their parent label is Voices of Wonder. Head Not Found was founded in 1992 and its offices are in Oslo.

The original founder was the Norwegian zine editor Jon "Metalion" Kristiansen.

Artists
The following artists released albums through Head Not Found:
 Alastis
 Atrox
 Carpe Tenebrum
 Enslavement of Beauty
 Gehenna
 Merciless
 Pazuzu
 Ragnarok
 The Kovenant
 The 3rd and the Mortal
 Trelldom
 Troll
 Twin Obscenity
 Ulver
 Valhall
 Windir

References

External links
 VME homepage

Black metal record labels
Heavy metal record labels
Norwegian record labels